Miguel Luis "Migz" Reyes Villafuerte is a Filipino politician and model, who has been Governor of Camarines Sur from 2013 to 2022. He graduated from the University of San Diego with a Bachelor of Arts degree in political science.

He is from the Villafuerte clan; his grandfather, Luis Villafuerte, was a congressman from 2004 to 2013 and former governor of the same province from 1988 to 1992 and from 1995 to 2004. His father is Luis Raymund Villafuerte, who served as a governor from 2004 to 2013, while his paternal grandmother, Nelly Favis Villafuerte, is a former member of the Monetary Board.

Personal life
In July 2021, he married model and former beauty pageant titleholder Rachel Peters in a civil ceremony. In October 2021, Peters gave birth to their first child.

Political life
He was elected Governor of Camarines Sur in 2013, defeating his grandfather Luis. At the age of 24, he is the youngest elected governor in Philippine history, surpassing Mark Lapid. Along with Jolo Revilla (then Vice-Governor of Cavite), Villafuerte is among the youngest politicians elected in the 2013 polls. He was reelected to office in the 2016 and 2019 polls, while his father was likewise elected to Congress as Camarines Sur Representative. His grandfather, on the other hand, lost his Congressional bid during the 2016 and 2019 elections.

References

1989 births
Living people
Governors of Camarines Sur
Filipino male models
Bicolano politicians
Nacionalista Party politicians
Bicolano people
People from Camarines Sur
University of San Diego alumni